, transliterated as Aeris Gainsborough in the English releases of Final Fantasy VII and Final Fantasy Tactics, is a fictional character in Square's (now Square Enix) role-playing video game Final Fantasy VII. She was designed by Tetsuya Nomura with influence from Yoshinori Kitase, Hironobu Sakaguchi and Yoshitaka Amano.

One of the main characters of Final Fantasy VII, she is a young woman who is allied with the eco-terrorist organization AVALANCHE. As the story progresses, AVALANCHE begin to pursue the game's antagonist Sephiroth, and the player learns that she is the last surviving Cetra, or "Ancient", one of the planet's oldest races. She has also appeared in the later-released Compilation of Final Fantasy VII and Kingdom Hearts series.

Her voice-actress is Maaya Sakamoto in Japanese. In English releases, her voice-actresses are singer and actress Mandy Moore in Kingdom Hearts, actress Mena Suvari in Kingdom Hearts II and Final Fantasy VII Advent Children, actress Andrea Bowen in Crisis Core: Final Fantasy VII, as well as the Re Mind DLC of Kingdom Hearts III, and actress Briana White in Final Fantasy VII Remake and Crisis Core: Final Fantasy VII Reunion. The character and the events surrounding her death in Final Fantasy VII have met with an overall positive reception from critics and fans.

Concept and creation
Aerith was designed by Tetsuya Nomura, with influence from director and scenario writer Yoshinori Kitase and Hironobu Sakaguchi, whilst Yoshitaka Amano created conceptual artwork which too helped to influence her design. She has green eyes and long brown hair tied in a braid with a pink ribbon. She wears a long pink dress, a bolero jacket, and brown hiking boots. The long dress was designed to appear ladylike and as a contrast to Tifa Lockhart's miniskirt. During development, Aerith was supposed to be Sephiroth's sister as both designs resembled each other, but they were made former lovers with Aerith remembering Sephiroth when meeting Cloud as both are ex-SOLDIERS. Late during development, Aerith's first love was changed to Zack Fair.

Her green eyes were meant to symbolize nature and also served as another contrast to Tifa's brown eyes. Nomura did not change much of Aerith's design for Advent Children, but her design was updated in Kingdom Hearts with the removal of her bolero jacket, which made her attire appear more as Amano had originally drawn her. Other changes included the addition of bracelets and a belt. Nomura modified her dress in Before Crisis, adding white and green colors, and this version was also used as the basis for her design in Kingdom Hearts II.

Aerith's original Japanese name is エアリス Earisu, . This was transliterated to "Aeris" in Final Fantasy VII and Final Fantasy Tactics and "Aerith" in later products. Both transliterations have basis, as the Japanese "su" (ス) is used when transcribing "s" and "th" to Japanese. However, official Japanese material uses the spelling "Aerith", and developers stated that "Aerith" is a near-anagram of "Earth".

In early planning stages of Final Fantasy VII, Aerith was to be one of only three protagonists; herself, Cloud and Barret. During a phone call to Kitase, it was suggested that at some point in the game, one of the main characters should die, and after much discussion as to whether it should be Barret or Aerith, the producers chose Aerith. Nomura stated in a 2005 Electronic Gaming Monthly interview: "Cloud's the main character, so you can't really kill him. And Barrett...  well, that's maybe too obvious". While designing Final Fantasy VII, Nomura was frustrated with the "perennial cliché where the protagonist loves someone very much and so has to sacrifice himself and die in a dramatic fashion to express that love". He found this trope appeared in both films and video games from North America and Japan, and asked "Is it right to set such an example to people?" Kitase concluded: "In the real world things are very different. You just need to look around you. Nobody wants to die that way. People die of disease and accident. Death comes suddenly and there is no notion of good or bad. It leaves, not a dramatic feeling but great emptiness. When you lose someone you loved very much you feel this big empty space and think, 'If I had known this was coming I would have done things differently'. These are the feelings I wanted to arouse in the players with Aerith's death relatively early in the game. Feelings of reality and not Hollywood".

According to Nomura, "death should be something sudden and unexpected, and Aerith's death seemed more natural and realistic". He said: "When I reflect on Final Fantasy VII, the fact that fans were so offended by her sudden death probably means that we were successful with her character. If fans had simply accepted her death, that would have meant she wasn't an effective character". From the original release of the game, rumors have circulated that Aerith can be resurrected in or that the original plan was to have her come back, but this was scrapped in development. Nomura has categorically stated that neither of these rumors were ever true, as he said that "the world was expecting us to bring her back to life, as this is the classic convention". A lengthy petition asking for Aerith's revival by Japanese players was sent to Kitase, but he dismissed it, pointing out that "there are many meanings in Aerith's death and [her revival] could never happen". Mena Suvari explained that for Advent Children Aerith was given a mothering feel with an ephemeral presence. She was expressed in joy for her role.

With regards to the Remake, Square wanted to avoid showing too much favoritism to either girl in their love triangle with the main character Cloud. Briana White studied Sakamoto's acting in order to appeal to fans.

Musical theme

A leitmotif associated with Aerith is played several times throughout Final Fantasy VII; it is first heard during the flashback scenes with Aerith's mother at her house, and is repeated as she is killed by Sephiroth. It was composed by Final Fantasy composer Nobuo Uematsu. The piece "Flowers Blooming in the Church" is based on it.

"Aerith's Theme" is very popular among Final Fantasy fans, and has inspired an orchestral version, a piano version, and a vocal version performed by the artist Rikki (who also performed "Suteki Da Ne" for Final Fantasy X). A piano arrangement of the theme appears twice in Advent Children, and the track "Water" echoes shades of the theme: the opening phrase of "Aerith's Theme" appears just prior to the climax of the track "Divinity II", which shortly thereafter includes as its final line the Latin phrase "Sola Dea fatum novit" ("Only the goddess knows fate"), and is also featured during the end credits of the film. It has been reinterpreted on the OverClocked ReMix Final Fantasy VII compilation Voices of the Lifestream. In 2013, "Aerith's Theme" achieved the third place in the Classic FM Hall of Fame.

Appearances

Final Fantasy VII 
Aerith Gainsborough is first introduced as a flower seller, when she briefly converses with Cloud Strife, a mercenary working for the anti-government group AVALANCHE, who are fleeing from the bombing of a Mako reactor. The two later meet in Aerith's church in the Sector 5 slums, where she is faced with the possibility of capture by the Turks. Aerith asks Cloud to be her bodyguard for the cost of one date. She is eventually apprehended, but is ultimately rescued by Cloud and his allies. Aerith then joins them in the pursuit of Sephiroth, while also embarking on her own journey of self-discovery.

After a failed attempt to foil Sephiroth's theft of the Black Materia, Aerith ventures alone into the Forgotten City. Cloud and his companions give chase, eventually finding her praying at an altar. As Aerith looks up to smile at Cloud, Sephiroth appears and kills her by impaling her through the torso. Cloud carries Aerith's body out into a lake in the Forgotten City, and releases her back to the Planet. Reeve Tuesti, the head of Shinra Urban and Development, brings the news of her death to Elmyra Gainsborough, Aerith's adoptive mother. The party later learns the reason for Aerith being in the Forgotten City; through her White Materia, Aerith was able to summon Holy, the only force capable of repelling the ultimate destructive magic, Meteor, which has been summoned by Sephiroth. Although Aerith successfully cast Holy before her death, it is held back by the power of Sephiroth's will. When Sephiroth is finally defeated and Holy is released, it appears that it is too late to function as effectively as it should, as Meteor has already come too near to the Planet's surface. While Holy clashes with Meteor, attempting to prevent its impact, the gravity of both Meteor and the Planet pulling on Holy in opposite directions weakens it. Aerith is seen praying with both hands interlocked whilst urging the lifestream to ultimately defend the planet. The Planet's Lifestream then flows forth, intervening between Holy and Meteor, and acting as a battering ram while aiding in the destruction of Meteor.

Compilation of Final Fantasy VII
In Before Crisis: Final Fantasy VII, set several years prior to the events of Final Fantasy VII, Aerith becomes the target of the original incarnation of AVALANCHE, led by Elfé, who seek to prevent Shinra from acquiring the last surviving Cetra. Instead, AVALANCHE intend to use her to learn the whereabouts of the Promised Land for their own purposes, although a member of the Turks tries to protect her.

Aerith makes several appearances in the CGI film Final Fantasy VII: Advent Children, as Cloud's spiritual guide, urging him to move on with his life and to forgive himself for the tragedies that were beyond of his control, telling him that she never blamed him for her death. During their spiritual reunion, Aerith speaks to Cloud in an open meadow laden with flowers, cheerfully and kindheartedly poking fun at how he needlessly burdens himself with the past. However, she acknowledges his suffering and offers kind words of support. One of Aerith's interactions with Cloud comes when each member of the original game's party helps in Cloud's final attack against Bahamut SIN; she appears as the last party member to assist Cloud. She appears again in the final scene of the film, along with Zack Fair, where she gives Cloud more words of encouragement before she and Zack walk into the light. Near the end of the film, it is discovered that water mixed with the Lifestream flows beneath the flowerbed in Aerith's church, which manifests itself as a cure for Geostigma.

The On the Way to a Smile novella "Case of the Lifestream – Black & White" focuses on Aerith and Sephiroth's respective journeys through the Lifestream after the end of the game but before the events of the film. The "Black" section deals with Sephiroth, and the "White" with Aerith.

Aerith appears in the prequel game Crisis Core: Final Fantasy VII. At the age of 16, she meets Zack, for whom she develops feelings during his stay in Midgar. Aerith and Zack develop a romantic relationship, but Zack is killed at the end of Crisis Core after being held in a Mako chamber for four years in the Shinra Mansion basement. During those years, Aerith helped her adopted mother earn a living by growing and selling flowers, a job that results in her meeting Cloud at the beginning of Final Fantasy VII.

Aerith features prominently in Final Fantasy VII Remake, which covers only the Midgar portion of the original game. Unlike in the original localization, the remake gives her name as the more widely-accepted Aerith rather than Aeris.

Other appearances
Aerith's character has appeared in several games outside of the Final Fantasy VII continuity. In Final Fantasy Tactics, she appears as a flower girl; when a group of criminals harasses her, Cloud appears and the player engages in battle with the group, letting her escape. Itadaki Street Special features a playable version of Aerith, as well as other Final Fantasy VII characters Tifa Lockhart, Cloud Strife, and Sephiroth. She also appears in Itadaki Street Portable with the same characters from Special, with the addition of Yuffie Kisaragi. While not playable, Aerith appears in the fighting game Dissidia 012 Final Fantasy as an assistant character. She is also featured in the rhythm game Theatrhythm Final Fantasy as a sub-character representing Final Fantasy VII. In LittleBigPlanet 2, Aerith is featured as a downloadable character model. Aerith also appears as a Mii costume and spirit in Super Smash Bros. Ultimate.

Aerith makes an appearance in the Kingdom Hearts series as a member of a group dedicated to defeating the Heartless; the group also includes fellow Final Fantasy VII characters Yuffie and Cid, and Leon of Final Fantasy VIII. In the plot of Kingdom Hearts, Aerith suggests a method for defeating the Heartless to protagonists Donald Duck, Goofy and Sora, and gives advice to the player throughout the game. She also appears in Kingdom Hearts: Chain of Memories as a perceptive figment of Sora's memories. Aerith returns in Kingdom Hearts II, wearing a modified version of her dress from Before Crisis. She, Leon, Cid and Yuffie run a restoration committee for the town of Hollow Bastion. Aerith and the restoration committee return in the Kingdom Hearts III Re Mind expansion, helping Riku search for the missing Sora.

Hoshi o Meguru Otome, a novella written by Benny Matsuyama which appears in the Final Fantasy VII Ultimania Ω guide, follows Aerith's journey through the Lifestream immediately after her death in Final Fantasy VII. Aerith is mentioned in a graffiti in the subway station early in the animated film Wreck-It Ralph; the graffiti reads "Aerith Lives".

Reception

General
Aerith has received an overall positive reception from critics. GamesTM referred to her as a "gaming legend". RPGamer's Stuart Hoggan opined that although Aerith "represented the token damsel in distress", she "broke the mould in terms of personality", possessing "an admirable pluck that was not brassy nor off-putting". In 2007, she was included in Tom's Games list of top 50 greatest female characters in video game history, for her death scene and the beauty of her appearance and personality. That same year, she was named the fifth best character of all time in Dengeki PlayStations retrospective awards feature about the original PlayStation. IGN ranked her the number two in their top Final Fantasy VII character list – a rank higher than the game's protagonist, Cloud Strife. GameTrailers ranked her at the top of their list of "babes who are out of your league" in 2010. Heath Hooker of GameZone ranked Aerith as fifth on his 2012 top list of Final Fantasy characters and wrote she "has become an icon in not only the Final Fantasy series, but also in video game history". Aerith's reception has not been completely uncritical. In a This American Life episode, titled "Save the Girl", reporter Lina Misitzis described the character as one-dimensional and lacking in personality. She and Kotaku writer Mike Fahey conclude that had the character been anything other than a pretty girl she would have needed much more development in order to elicit an emotional response from the player.

Aerith's romantic relationship with Cloud was also praised though some sites noted there were arguments between fans about whether or not Tifa was more suitable to be Cloud's love interest. In a retrospective, Polygon analyzed several arguments fans have made about Cloud's preferred partner and how each side misrepresents the other's chosen heroine. Polygon concludes that there is no winning couple as, after killing Sephiroth, Cloud has a vision of Aerith when Tifa tries to help him and the duo agrees to meet her again. In contrast to this, Aerith's relationship with Zack Fair was noted to be a more impactful based on her role in Crisis Core. The character's traits in the remake were praised by Siliconera due to how caring she is and how developed she becomes across the narrative. Despite criticizing for not doing wrong things that balance her, Siliconera still enjoyed the scene where she volunteers for Don Corneo. Nevertheless, the site enjoyed how enigmatic she is for the way she interacts with the members from the cast. 

In 2010, Famitsu readers voted Aerith as the 24th best video game character. In 2013, Aerith was voted the second favorite female Final Fantasy character in an official poll by Square Enix. That same year, Complex ranked her as the seventh greatest Final Fantasy character of all time. In 2020, the Japanese broadcaster NHK concluded their global but Japan-focused poll for all Final Fantasy titles. Among characters Aerith ranked in third place, behind the first place for Cloud and a second place for Yuna from Final Fantasy X, thus making Aerith the second most popular female and Final Fantasy VII character respectively.

Death

Aerith's death in Final Fantasy VII has received a great deal of attention. According to GamesTM, her death helped establish the popularity of Final Fantasy VII. Players commented on message boards and blogs about the emotional impact the scene held. Fans submitted a petition to Yoshinori Kitase requesting her return. GameSpy numbers her demise as the 10th greatest cinematic moment in video game history, while its readers voted it the second most cinematic moment. GamePro considers her death sequence to be the greatest of all gaming moments. Tom's Games called the scene "one of the most powerful and memorable scenes of the Final Fantasy series—or any other game, for that matter". Edge called her death the "dramatic highpoint" of Final Fantasy VII, and suggested that reintroducing her through the Compilation of Final Fantasy VII titles "arguably undermines this great moment". In 2005, Electronic Gaming Monthly listed Final Fantasy VII number six in their list of ten most important games, stating that without this game, "Aeris wouldn't have died, and gamers wouldn't have learned how to cry". In 2011, IGN ranked her death scene at No. 1 in its list of top video game moments. In 2012, PlayStation Magazine included it among the ten most emotional PlayStation moments. Said death has also been cited as the defining moment of a star-crossed love story, between her and main character Cloud Strife.

Brian Taylor, writing for Kill Screen, described a cottage industry of fan theories for how to return Aerith to life or prevent her death. He compared these efforts to the letter-writing campaign to convince Charles Dickens not to let Nell, the endearing protagonist of The Old Curiosity Shop, die at the end of the book. Taylor affirmed that the acts of discussing these fan theories and dissecting the game code to test them comprise a valid and important part of the experience of the game.

Analysis
The Escapist noted that while the player primarily controls Cloud, Aerith remains as the actual hero of the game. Despite being seen as a damsel in distress at first, Aerith proves herself to be capable of showing notable strength which made a massive impact in the gamer when Sephiroth kills her. As a result, when the Remake was released, gamers wondered 
if in this game it was possible to save her.

In The World of Final Fantasy VII: Essays on the Game and Its Legacy, Aerith's death is described as a disastrous traumatic reminder of the eventual war. Game journalist Mike Fahey expressed concern in regards to this event being repeated in the Remake chronology as he saw the original Aerith as the least developed heroine in the game. In A Feeling of Wrongness: Pessimistic Rhetoric on the Fringes of Popular Culture, Aerith is seen a highly developed character due to Cloud visiting her mother and how often the protagonist and the heroine often talk. As Aerith plays a more role in combat, her death is also noted to affect the gamer as a result of how useful she is.

See also
 List of Final Fantasy VII characters

References

External links
 
 Aerith Gainsborough at the Final Fantasy wiki

Adoptee characters in video games
Characters designed by Tetsuya Nomura
Female characters in video games
Final Fantasy VII characters
Fictional characters who can manipulate light
Fictional characters with healing abilities
Fictional human hybrids
Fictional salespeople
Fictional spiritual mediums
Fictional stick-fighters
Fictional witches
Orphan characters in video games
Science fantasy video game characters
Square Enix protagonists
Video game characters introduced in 1997
Video game characters who use magic
Woman soldier and warrior characters in video games